Mala Malasar is an unclassified Southern Dravidian language spoken by a Scheduled tribe of India. It is close to Irula.

References

Dravidian languages